was a Japanese politician of the New Komeito Party, a member of the House of Councillors in the Diet (national legislature). A native of Chiba, Chiba, he graduated from Soka University and received a Ph.D. in the study of peace from University of Bradford in the United Kingdom. He was elected to the House of Councillors for the first time in 2001.
Toyama retired on February 1, 2021, after being accused of misconduct.

References

External links 
  in Japanese.

Living people
1969 births
People from Chiba (city)
Alumni of the University of Bradford
New Komeito politicians
Members of the House of Councillors (Japan)
21st-century Japanese politicians